George W. Wallace Jr. (born May 30, 1938) is a Liberian who served as the foreign minister of Liberia from 2006 to 2007. He took office early in 2006, having been appointed to the cabinet of the incoming president Ellen Johnson Sirleaf and confirmed by the Senate. Wallace has had a long career as a Liberian diplomat and ambassador through all of its governments during the past several decades. In a cabinet reshuffle on August 22, 2007, he was replaced as foreign minister by Olubanka King Akerele and became special adviser to President Johnson Sirleaf instead.

Wallace was born to George Wallace and Elizabeth Yebade Wallace in Monrovia, Liberia.

Political career

Zero-tax treatment 
During a visit to Liberia with Chinese President Hu Jingtao, Mr. Bo Xilai and Wallace, signed a document to increase the scope of zero-tariff treatment for goods imported from Liberia to 442 tax items.

References

Americo-Liberian people
Liberian diplomats
Foreign Ministers of Liberia
Living people
1938 births
Ambassadors of Liberia
Politicians from Monrovia